Crystal Castles is an arcade game released by Atari, Inc. in 1983. The player controls Bentley Bear who has to collect gems located throughout trimetric-projected rendered castles while avoiding enemies, some of whom are after the gems as well. Crystal Castles is one of the first arcade action games with an ending, instead of continuing indefinitely, looping, or ending in a kill screen, and to contain advance warp zones.

Gameplay

Crystal Castles has nine levels with four castles each, and a tenth level with a single castle—the clearing of which ends the game. Each of the 37 trimetric-projected castles consists of a maze of hallways filled with gems and bonus objects and also includes stairs, elevators and tunnels that the player can use as shortcuts. The three-letter initials of the player with the highest score are used to form the first level's castle structure. When all gems in a castle have been collected, a tune of the Nutcracker Suite is played, and the player moves to the next castle.

A trackball and jump button control Bentley Bear. Gems are collected by walking over them, and a bonus is given upon collection of the last gem. While collecting gems, there are a number of enemies that try to stop Bentley and/or collect the gems for themselves. Any gems collected by the enemies also result in a lower obtainable score for that screen. Likewise, if the last available gem is collected by the enemy, the player also loses the last gem bonus.

Enemies can be avoided by use of the maze and its constructs, or by Bentley leaping opponents via the jump button, in some cases also allowing him to stun them. Some types of enemies will track Bentley's movements in certain ways, while others move at random. If Bentley is touched and loses a life, he "cries out" via a cartoonish speech balloon. If at least 3 lives remain, he says "BYE!"; if 2 lives remain, the quotation is "OH NO!"; if 1 is left, it is "OUCH!"; and finally, for the last lost life (which ends the game), he says "#?!", so as to imitate an obscenity.

At the start of a maze, gems are worth 1 point. This increases by 1 for every gem Bentley collects, up to a maximum of 99. Each maze includes a hat or honey pot, which serve the dual purpose of awarding points and letting Bentley defeat specific enemies. The hat (500 points) makes Bentley briefly invulnerable. The hat also allows him to eliminate Berthilda the witch (3,000), who appears in the last maze of each level. Picking up the honey pot (1,000) can delay the landing of a swarm of bees.

Other villains include Nasty Trees which become more aggressive as levels progress, a ghost that will usually appear in the Hidden Spiral levels, dancing skeletons, Gem Eaters whom Bentley Bear can defeat if he catches them while eating a gem, and Crystal Balls that appear in later levels and tend to follow Bentley Bear as he collects gems. The Nasty Trees and Crystal Balls can also pick up gems.

The player can skip some castles and acquire additional lives and points by using secret warps activated by making Bentley Bear jump at special locations.

Crystal Castles contains two easter eggs. Jumping 100 times or more in the southeast corner of level 1‒1 and clearing the maze of all gems will make ATARI appear on level 1‒2. On level 5‒4, if the player kills Berthilda and goes to the corner of the area where she was and jumps, "FXL" appears in the southeast corner of the screen. These are the initials of programmer Franz X. Lanzinger.

Development
Crystal Castles was the first game with the Leta chip, a custom trackball controller chip designed by Scott Fuller.

Bentley Bear was named Braveheart Bear in the released prototypes, but Atari decided to change the name when advocates for Native Americans complained.

Ports
Crystal Castles was ported to the Apple II, Atari 2600, Atari 8-bit family, Atari ST, Commodore 64, BBC Micro, Acorn Electron, ZX Spectrum, and Amstrad CPC. The Atari 8-bit version was nearly finished in 1984, but was not released until 1988 as a cartridge in the styling of Atari XEGS games. There are two versions for the C64: a prototype by Atarisoft that wasn't released at the time but purchased by U.S. Gold and released in Europe in 1986; and one by Thundervision in the US in 1985.

Reception 
Atari manufactured 5,380 Crystal Castles arcade cabinets. In Japan, Game Machine listed Crystal Castles on their December 15, 1983 issue as being the fifth most-successful upright arcade unit of the month.

Computer and Video Games reviewed the Atari VCS version, giving it an 80% rating. In 1995, Flux magazine ranked the game 95th on their "Top 100 Video Games.”

Legacy
Was inspiration for the mid-2000s, electropunk band Crystal Castles despite their claims to have never liked video games.

Crystal Castles is included in multiple anthologies, including Atari Anniversary Edition and Atari Vault.

Bentley Bear is a playable character in Atari Karts for the Atari Jaguar.

References

External links

Crystal Castles at Arcade History
Crystal Castles for the Atari 8-bit family at Atari Mania

The Making Of Crystal Castles speech by Franz Lanzinger

1983 video games
Amstrad CPC games
Apple II games
Arcade video games
Atari 2600 games
Atari 8-bit family games
Atari arcade games
Atari ST games
BBC Micro and Acorn Electron games
Cancelled Atari 7800 games
Commodore 64 games
Maze games
Multiplayer and single-player video games
Trackball video games
U.S. Gold games
Video games about bears
Video games developed in the United States
Video games about witchcraft
Video games set in castles
ZX Spectrum games